Bahlika may refer to :

 Ancient Bactria
 Bahlikas, ancient country/region
 modern Balkh
 Bahlika (Mahabharata), the king of Bahlika kingdom in the Hindu epic Mahabharata